John Jasper (July 4, 1812 – March 30, 1901) was an ex-slave who became a Baptist minister and noted public speaker for Christianity after the American Civil War.

Early life
Born into slavery on July 4, 1812, in Fluvanna County, Virginia, to Philip and Tina Jasper one of twenty-four children of Philip. Philip was a well known Baptist preacher while Tina was a slave of a Mr. Peachy. Jasper was hired out to various people and when Mr. Peachy's mistress died, he was given to her son, John Blair Peachy, a lawyer who moved to Louisiana. Jasper's time in Louisiana was short, as his new master soon died, and he returned to Richmond, Virginia. Jasper experienced a personal conversion to Christianity in Capital Square in 1839. Jasper convinced a fellow slave to teach him to read and write, and began studying to become a Baptist minister.

Family
Jasper married three times: first to Elvy Weaden, who left him, secondly, to Candus Jordan in 1844, with whom he had nine children before they divorced, and thirdly to Mary Ann Cole in 1863, who died on August 6, 1874.

Career
For more than two decades, Rev. Jasper traveled throughout Virginia, often preaching at funeral services for fellow slaves. He often preached at Third Baptist Church in Petersburg, Virginia. He also preached to Confederate Soldiers during the American Civil War (1861–65).

After his own emancipation following the American Civil War, Rev. Jasper founded the Sixth Mount Zion Baptist Church in Richmond, which by 1887 had attracted 2500 members and served as a religious and social center of Richmond's predominantly black Jackson Ward—providing a Sunday School and other services. Jasper's vivid oratory and dramatic speaking style brought renown and calls for him to preach throughout the Eastern United States. His most famous sermon, The Sun Do Move, expressed his deep faith in God through the imagery of a flat Earth above which the sun circuits. He first preached this sermon in March 1878 on the basis of Biblical revelation. Despite his views being contrary to modern scientific theory, he went on to preach this sermon 273 times throughout the U.S., often to thousands of people at once, as well as in London, Paris, and before the Virginia General Assembly.

Death and legacy
John Jasper left a lasting legacy as one of the most respected figures in Richmond's history, especially among the African-American and Southern Baptist communities. He delivered his last sermon a few days before his death at the age of 88. The Library of Virginia honored him as one of the African-American trailblazers in its "Strong Men and Women" series in 2012. The words of his most famous sermon, The Sun Do Move, have since been modernized into standard English from the original Patois. His name is remembered for his unswerving allegiance to the Bible from which he preached.

References

External links

1812 births
1901 deaths
19th-century African-American people
African-American Baptist ministers
Baptists from Virginia
Flat Earth proponents
People from Fluvanna County, Virginia
19th-century American clergy